Group A of the 2022 FIFA World Cup took place from 20 to 29 November 2022. The group consisted of host nation Qatar, Ecuador, Senegal and the Netherlands. The top two teams, the Netherlands and Senegal, advanced to the round of 16. Qatar became the first host nation to lose every group game in the World Cup history, becoming the worst performing host.

Teams

Notes

Standings

In the round of 16:
 The winners of Group A, the Netherlands, advanced to play the runners-up of Group B, the United States.
 The runners-up of Group A, Senegal, advanced to play the winners of Group B, England.

Matches
All times listed are local, AST (UTC+3).

The match between Senegal and the Netherlands was originally scheduled to be the opening match of the tournament on 21 November 2022, 13:00, while the match between Qatar and Ecuador would take place later that day at 19:00. However, FIFA adjusted the match schedule on 11 August 2022, moving the Qatar–Ecuador fixture to 20 November in order for the hosts to feature in the opening match of the tournament. As a result, Senegal–Netherlands fixture was pushed back to 19:00 on 21 November.

Qatar vs Ecuador
The two teams had faced each other three times, most recently in 2018, a 4–3 win for Qatar in a friendly game. This was their first competitive meeting.

Ecuador had a disallowed goal in the opening minutes, but eventually won 2–0 with a brace by Enner Valencia in the first match of the tournament. Valencia opened the scoring in the 16th minute with a penalty, shooting low to the right corner after being brought down in the penalty area by Qatar goalkeeper Saad Al-Sheeb. He scored his second in the 31st minute with a downward header to the left corner of the net after a cross in from the right by Ángelo Preciado. This is the third consecutive FIFA World Cup in which a player scored a brace in the opening match, after Brazil's Neymar in 2014 and Russia's Denis Cheryshev in 2018. This was also the first time a penalty kick had been scored as the opening goal of a FIFA World Cup. Qatar became the 14th debutant to lose their opening fixture; additionally, they became the first host nation to lose their opening match at a World Cup.

Senegal vs Netherlands
The teams had never met before.

After a goalless first half, Cody Gakpo put the Netherlands ahead in the 84th minute when he got to the ball first to head past the advancing goalkeeper Édouard Mendy and into the empty net after a cross from Frenkie de Jong. In stoppage time, Davy Klaassen made it 2–0 when he followed up on Memphis Depay's saved shot to slot into the net.

Qatar vs Senegal
The two teams had never met before.
Boulaye Dia put Senegal in front in the 41st minute with a low finish to the left corner of the net after a mistake by Qatar defender Boualem Khoukhi. Seven minutes later it was 2-0 when Famara Diédhiou scored with a header from a corner from the right by Ismail Jakobs.
Mohammed Muntari pulled a goal back for Qater in the 78th minute when he scored with a header to the left corner after a cross from Ismaeel Mohammad on the right. Bamba Dieng scored a third for Senegal in the 84th minute with a deflected shot to the net after a pass from Iliman Ndiaye on the right.

Following the Netherlands' 1–1 draw with Ecuador played after this match, Qatar became the first host country to be eliminated from the group stage of the FIFA World Cup after just two games, and the second overall, after South Africa, to fail to progress to the knockout round. This loss also confirmed Qatar as the worst hosts by performance, as they could secure no more than three points, one short of South Africa's four.

Netherlands vs Ecuador
The two teams had faced each other twice, most recently in 2014, a 1–1 draw in a friendly game. In the 6th minute Cody Gakpo cut inside and shot left-footed to the left corner of the net from just outside the penalty area to put the Netherlands in front. Four minutes into the second half Enner Valencia scored his third goal of the tournament to make it 1-1 when he followed up the rebound after Andries Noppert had saved a shot from Pervis Estupiñán.

Ecuador vs Senegal
The two teams had faced each other twice, most recently in 2005, a 2–1 win for Senegal in a friendly.
In the 44th minute, Ismaïla Sarr was fouled in the penalty area by Piero Hincapié with Sarr scoring the resulting penalty low to the right corner. In the 67th minute Moisés Caicedo made it 1-1 when he finished the ball low to the net from close range after it reached him from a corner on the right from Félix Torres.
With twenty minutes to go Kalidou Koulibaly put Senegal back in front with a right-foot volley from six yards out after the ball came to him after a free-kick from the right. It was his first ever goal for Senegal.

Ecuador's loss led to being eliminated from the Group Stage for a second time, the first being in 2014.

Netherlands vs Qatar
The two teams had never met before.
In the 26th minute Cody Gakpo scored his third goal of the tournament to put the Netherlands in front when he cut in from the left to score with a right-foot finish to the bottom right corner of the net from just inside the penalty area. Frenkie de Jong made it 2-0 four minutes into the second half when he followed up to poke into the net from close range after Meshaal Barsham had saved a shot from Memphis Depay.
In losing to the Netherlands, Qatar are the first World Cup hosts in history to suffer three defeats and failed to earn a single point.

Discipline
Fair play points would have been used as tiebreakers if the overall and head-to-head records of teams were tied. These were calculated based on yellow and red cards received in all group matches as follows:
first yellow card: −1 point;
indirect red card (second yellow card): −3 points;
direct red card: −4 points;
yellow card and direct red card: −5 points;

Only one of the above deductions were applied to a player in a single match.

References

External links

 

2022 FIFA World Cup
Qatar at the 2022 FIFA World Cup
Ecuador at the 2022 FIFA World Cup
Senegal at the 2022 FIFA World Cup
Netherlands at the 2022 FIFA World Cup